Jim Pace (February 1, 1961 – November 13, 2020) was an American racing driver.

Racing career
He began his career in the Barber Saab Pro Series in 1988. He soon moved to sports car racing and won the GTU class at the 1990 24 Hours of Daytona. Pace, along with co-drivers Scott Sharp and Wayne Taylor, drove the Riley & Scott Mk III to the overall victory in the 1996 24 Hours of Daytona, then weeks later also won the 12 Hours of Sebring. Later in 1996, Pace was a race driver for the same team in the 24 Hours of Le Mans. After years of only driving at Daytona, Pace returned to regular drives in the Rolex Sports Car Series GT class in 2007. In 2008, he drove a Porsche 911 for The Racer's Group, and in 2009 drove for Farnbacher Loles Racing. In later years, he participated in vintage racing events.

Personal life
Jim Pace was born on February 1, 1961, in Monticello, Mississippi. He attended Mississippi State University.

Pace resided in Ridgeland, Mississippi. He died from COVID-19 in Memphis, Tennessee, on November 13, 2020, at the age of 59.

Racing record

24 Hours of Le Mans

WeatherTech SportsCar Championship 
(key) (Races in bold indicate pole position) (Races in italics indicate fastest lap)

References

External links
Jim Pace bio at Grand-Am Rolex Sports Car Series

1961 births
2020 deaths
24 Hours of Daytona drivers
24 Hours of Le Mans drivers
Rolex Sports Car Series drivers
Mississippi State University alumni
People from Monticello, Mississippi
People from Ridgeland, Mississippi
Racing drivers from Mississippi
Barber Pro Series drivers
WeatherTech SportsCar Championship drivers
12 Hours of Sebring drivers
Deaths from the COVID-19 pandemic in Tennessee